François Rebel (19 June 17017 November 1775) was a French composer of the Baroque era. Born in Paris, the son of the leading composer Jean-Féry Rebel, he was a child prodigy who became a violinist in the orchestra of the Paris Opera at the age of 13. As a composer he is best known for his close collaboration with François Francoeur (see that page for further details of their works).

Selected recordings
Zélindor, roi des Sylphes

Sources
The Viking Opera Guide ed. Holden (1993)

External links
 Biography at hoasm.org
 

1701 births
1775 deaths
Musicians from Paris
French male classical composers
French opera composers
Male opera composers
French Baroque composers
French theatre managers and producers
Opera managers
Directors of the Paris Opera
French Classical-period composers
18th-century classical composers
18th-century French composers
18th-century French male musicians
17th-century male musicians